Trek is a French themed television channel owned by Mediawan Thematics.

History
Trek began broadcasting on February 2, 2015, replacing Escales.

Trek was removed of Orange on 9 July 2020, and of Canal+ on 1 September 2020.

Programming
The channel broadcasts programs dedicated to adventure, feats and thrills.

Every night of the week, Trek offers different sports: extreme on Monday, outdoor on Tuesdays, ski / snowboard on Wednesdays, expeditions on Thursdays, challenges on Friday, surfing on Saturdays and climbing on Sundays.

References

External links
 

Mediawan Thematics
Television stations in France
Television channels and stations established in 2015
French-language television stations
2015 establishments in France
Mass media in Paris